Nikki Louise Brammeier (née Harris; born 30 December 1986) is an English former professional racing cyclist from Draycott, Derbyshire. She began cycling at five and has won championships in various disciplines. Brammeier has competed in international events including the UCI Track Cycling World Cup Classics and the Commonwealth Games. She won her first UCI Cyclo-cross World Cup in 2015 at Cyclo-cross Namur.

In November 2017 Brammeier announced that she would be leaving the  team at the end of the year in order to focus solely on cyclo-cross. The following month she and her husband Matt Brammeier announced the establishment of the MUDIIITA cyclo-cross project, intended to encourage participation in the sport in the UK, including a professional team known as MUDIIITA–Canyon.

In June 2019 Brammeier announced her pregnancy and her retirement from cyclo-cross. In November of that year, Brammeier gave birth to a daughter.

Major results

Mountain Bike

2004
 1st  Cross-country, National Junior Championships
2011
 2nd Cross-country, National Championships
2012
 1st  Cross-country, National Championships
2018
 3rd Cross-country, National Championships

Road

2005
 1st Straiton, Women's National Series
2007
 1st  Road race, National Under-23 Championships
 4th National Criterium Championships
2016
 1st Stage 1 (TTT) Energiewacht Tour

Track

2002–2003
 National Junior Championships
1st  Individual pursuit
1st  500m time trial
1st  Points
2005–2006
 3rd Points, UCI World Cup Classics, Sydney

Cyclo-cross

2002–2003
 3rd National Championships
2003–2004
 National Trophy Series
2nd Matlock
3rd Ipswich
2005–2006
 National Trophy Series
3rd Chorley
2009–2010
 2nd National Championships
 2nd Tervuren
2010–2011
 2nd National Championships
2011–2012
 2nd National Championships
 2nd Ruddervoorde
 2nd Hoogstraten
 2nd Middelkerke
 2nd Overijse
 2nd Zonhoven
 3rd Overall Gazet van Antwerpen
3rd Koppenberg
3rd Essen
3rd Baal
 Fidea Classics
3rd Neerpelt
 3rd Gavere
 3rd Valkenburg
 3rd Heerlen
 3rd Rucphen
2012–2013
 1st  National Championships
 1st Ruddervoorde
 1st Gavere
 Soudal Classics
1st Niel
1st Leuven
2nd Antwerpen
 2nd Overijse
 3rd Overall UCI World Cup
2nd Koksijde
3rd Plzeň
 Bpost Bank Trophy
2nd Koppenberg
2nd Loenhout
2nd Baal
3rd Essen
 2nd Kalmthout
 3rd  UEC European Championships
2013–2014
 1st Hamme
 1st Hoogstraten
 2nd Overall UCI World Cup
2nd Tábor
3rd Valkenburg
3rd Koksijde
3rd Namur
 3rd Overall Bpost Bank Trophy
1st Ronse
3rd Koppenberg
3rd Essen
3rd Baal
 2nd  UEC European Championships
 2nd National Championships
 Soudal Classics
2nd Niel
3rd Leuven
3rd Antwerpen
 2nd Ruddervoorde
 2nd Heerlen
 2nd Rucphen
 3rd Gavere
 3rd Overijse
2014–2015
 1st Spa-Francorchamps
 1st Rucphen
 2nd National Championships
 2nd Zonhoven
 2nd Gavere
 2nd Oostmalle
 2nd Heerlen
 3rd  UEC European Championships
 UCI World Cup
3rd Milton Keynes
 3rd Brabant
2015–2016
 1st  National Championships
 3rd Overall UCI World Cup
1st Namur
2nd Koksijde
3rd Hoogerheide
 2nd Overall Superprestige
2nd Gieten
2nd Zonhoven
2nd Spa-Francorchamps
3rd Gavere
3rd Hoogstraten
3rd Middelkerke
 BPost Bank Trophy
2nd Sint-Niklaas
3rd Ronse
3rd Koppenberg
3rd Hamme
 2nd Rucphen
 3rd  UEC European Championships
 Soudal Classics
3rd Niel
 3rd Overijse
2016–2017
 1st  National Championships
 2nd Rucphen
 Superprestige
3rd Zonhoven
 Soudal Classics
3rd Neerpelt
2017–2018
 Soudal Classics
1st Niel
2nd Neerpelt
 2nd National Championships
 UCI World Cup
2nd Namur
 Superprestige
2nd Gieten
2nd Gavere
3rd Zonhoven
 2nd Overall DVV Trophy
2nd Essen
 3rd Brabant
2018–2019
 1st  National Championships
 UCI World Cup
2nd Koksijde
 Superprestige
2nd Gavere
 2nd Overijse
 3rd Overall DVV Trophy
3rd Baal
 3rd Gullegem
 3rd Illnau
2022–2023
 National Trophy Series
2nd Derby

References

External links

1986 births
Living people
British cycling road race champions
English female cyclists
People from the Borough of Erewash
Sportspeople from Derbyshire
Cyclists at the 2016 Summer Olympics
Olympic cyclists of Great Britain
Cyclo-cross cyclists